

References

 David Leighton, "Street Smarts: The history of Tucson's 'blacksmith alley'(Charles T. Etchells) Arizona Daily Star, Jan. 27, 2015
 David Leighton, "Street Smarts: Road honors husband of Tucson's first Christian Scientist,"(Gus. A. Hoff) Arizona Daily Star, June 15, 2015
 David Leighton, "Street Smarts: Midtown subdivision developer would go on to be Tucson mayor,"(Lew Davis) Arizona Daily Star, March 1, 2020

Tucson